The Mawson Plateau, located at  is part of the northern Flinders Ranges, located on the Mount Freeling pastoral lease in South Australia,  east of Lyndhurst and adjacent to the northeastern boundary of Arkaroola.

Geography
The Mawson Plateau is a 71 km² granite batholith at a height of between 600 and 750m. It is dissected by Saucepan Creek and the Granite Plateau Creek; both are tributaries of the Hamilton Creek. The plateau is bounded by the Hamilton Creek on the north and west, the Granite Escarpment on the east and Freeling Heights in the south.

Place names

Originally known as the Freeling Heights lower granite plateau, it was renamed The Mawson Plateau after Sir Douglas Mawson.

The main creek on the plateau has been known by successive owners of the Mount Freeling pastoral lease as the Granite Plateau Creek.

T Junction Waterhole appears on the Yudnamutana 1:50000 topographical map and is ~100m downstream from a distinctive T-junction on Granite Plateau Creek. The waterhole is the location of an old emergency rations cache put there in the early 1980s by the owners of the Arkaroola pastoral lease.

The Granite Escarpment also appears on the Yudnamutana 1:50000 topographical map. It is a high ridge of exposed and weathered granite overlooking Lake Frome.

In a gorge on Granite Plateau Creek there is a high granite cliff known to bushwalkers as Aqualung Wall . At the base of the cliff there are permanent waterholes containing water spiders (Dolomedes spp.). The name of the cliff refers to the spider’s habit of submerging below the surface to hunt, or avoid predation, while breathing from bubbles of air attached to hairs on its abdomen.

Edmunds Hill  is a small peak high on the central plateau with 360-degree panoramic views of the plateau, and is named after Lorraine Edmunds, Arkaroola's former information officer, National Parks employee, and conservationist.

There are numerous trough-like waterholes along the creeks on the Mawson Plateau, many are ephemeral being subject to adequate rainfall in creek catchments.

Ray's Waterhole is a picturesque permanent waterhole on Saucepan Creek.

The plateau is a remote and inaccessible wilderness and it is very unusual to find any modern human artifacts on the plateau. When they are found at, or near significant locations they occasionally contribute to the place name:

Stardrop Waterhole is a periodic waterhole upstream of Tee Junction Waterhole and is named after the solitary steel "star dropper" fence post found at the site. 

Saucepan Creek is a major tributary of the Granite Plateau Creek. The name refers to the discovery of two abandoned, or lost, saucepans found at different times, and at separate locations along the creek. One was found hanging from a river red gum at the junction (Saucepan Junction) of Saucepan Creek and the Granite Plateau Creek , the other was found near a major waterfall on Saucepan Creek.

Climate

The plateau is located within one of Australia’s major bioclimatic regions-the arid Eyrean region. Average rainfall on the adjoining pastoral lease of Arkaroola is 265 mm; however the Gammon Ranges Rainfall Project (Maier and Wright 1996), which began monitoring rainfall on the nearby Gammon Plateau at 930m in 1988 indicated that rainfall and number of rain days increases with altitudes greater than 400m above sea level in this area. With the Mawson Plateau at  ~700m, rainfall averages are likely to be higher than those at Arkaroola.

Maier and Wright found that increased rainfall at altitude was predominantly winter rainfall, however the area is strongly influenced by summer storms. The influence of these unpredictable summer storms is reflected in the differences between the highest and lowest annual rainfall records recorded at Arkaroola (56mm – 949mm).  Similar variations certainly occur on the Mawson Plateau.

Aquatic habitat

The plateau is a drainage basin for the Granite Plateau Creek, and its major tributary, Saucepan Creek. Both of these creeks flow only briefly after rain and as the region receives highly variable rainfall, water is scarce for most of the year and both creeks are ephemeral. In places the creeks have cut deep gorges and valleys into the plateau’s granite creating permanent and semi-permanent waterholes that support numerous species of frogs including the brown toadlet (Pseudophryne bibroniiand), water spiders (Dolomedes spp.) and small populations of unidentified fish. The fish are possibly spangled perch, (Leiopotherapon unicolor) a widely distributed desert fish common in much of the Hamilton Creek Catchment, or Lake Eyre Hardyhead, (Craterocephalus eyresii) the most common and widely distributed fish in the Flinders Ranges.

Fauna
Despite the relative abundance of permanent water, mammals and birds are sparse on the plateau, but there are small populations of euros (Macropus robustus), echidnas (Tachyglossus aculeatusand) and a few species of bats. Feral goats are rare. Common birds include willie wagtail (Rhipidura leucophrys), wedge-tailed eagle (Aquila audax), and the Australian boobook (Ninox boobook).

Reptiles have fared better than mammals and there are numerous species of snakes, skinks and dragons.

See also

Arkaroola
Gammon Ranges

Notes

Landforms of South Australia
Flinders Ranges
Plateaus of Australia
Far North (South Australia)